Accton Technology Corporation is a Taiwanese company in the electronics industry that primarily engages in the development and manufacture of networking and communication solutions, as an original equipment manufacturer (OEM) or original design manufacturer (ODM) partner.

Accton has manufacturing plants in both Taiwan (Hsinchu) and China (Shenzhen) and a total workforce of more than 5200 employees worldwide.

History
Accton was founded on February 9, 1988. Accton filled its IPO in November 1995.

Acquisitions
1999 – Emitcom
2000 – Minority stake in U.S. Robotics modem division from 3Com (with NatSteel from Singapore)
2010 – Mototech
2015 – SMC Networks

Joint ventures
2002 – Accton and SVA Group China – formed SVA Accton
2003 – Accton and Philips – formed Arcadyan Technology
2011 – Accton and Alvarion – formed AWB

Exits
2004 – ADMTek Inc to Infineon for €80 million 
2006 – 69% of Arcadyan Technology to Compal for US$30 million

Services

OEM of networking gear

ODM of networking gear
Design and Development
Supply Chain
Manufacturing

Finance

During the year 2009, Accton obtained approximately 69% and 14% of its total revenue from switches and WLAN products, respectively.

During the year 2017, Accton obtained approximately 68% and 12% out of its total revenue from network switches and network appliances. Network access came third with 9%, followed by 5% in Wireless networking and 1% of the revenue coming from Broadband networking gear.

Total sales for 2018 increased 18.23 percent annually to NT$43.09 billion (over USD$1.3 billion) with Facebook, Amazon (company), and HP Inc  weighing in.

Corporate Affairs

Management

Accton's key management personnel consists of:
 Fai-Long Kuo (Chairman)
 Edgar Masri (Chief Executive Officer and President)
 Ji-Shang Yu (Senior Vice President of Manufacturing)
 Michael K.T. Lee (Senior Vice President of R&D)
 Meen-Ron Lin (Chief Financial Officer)
 Melody Chiang (Senior Vice President of Product Development & Management)
 Jackal Lee (Senior Vice President of Product Supply & Demand)
 Phillip Wang (Vice President)
 Hin-Soon Liew (Vice President)

Board of Directors
Accton's board consists of the following directors:
 Fai-Long Kuo (Chairman at Accton, former Executive Vice President at Accton)
 Meen-Ron Lin (Director at Accton, former Manager at Capital Securities Corporation)
 Heng-Yi Tu (Director at Accton, Chairman of Wan Yuan Textiles, Chung Tai Transportation, and Ting Sing Co, Director of Ve Wong Corporation, SECOM, South China Insurance, and The Ambassador Hotel)
 Kuo-Hsiu Huang (Director at Accton, President of Accton Technology China)
 Chung Laung Liu (Independent Director at Accton, Chairman of TrendForce Corporation, director of United Microelectronics Corporation, and FarEasTone Telecommunications)
 Chih-Ping Chang (Independent Director at Accton, CEO of CTBC Bank Anti-Drug Educational Foundation and former director of the anti-money laundering division at Ministry of Justice’s Investigation Bureau)
 Shuh Chen (Independent Director at Accton, Chairman of Central Investment Holding Corporation and former Chairman of Taipei Exchange and Administrative Deputy Minister of Ministry of Finance)
 Shiou-Ling Lin (Independent Director at Accton, Director of Cathay Financial Holdings Co., Executive Director of Tong Lung Metals Co., Director of ETurboTouch, and of Counsel of Lee and Li Attorneys-at-Law)
 Chen Wei-zen (Independent Director at Accton, supreme consultant of the Formosa Plastics Corporation and former Minister of the Interior, Secretary-General of Executive Yuan, Deputy Mayor of Taipei City, Administrative Deputy Minister of Transportation and Communications, and Deputy Mayor of Taipei County)

Products
 CheetaHub Classic 2040, 1 10BASE2 / BNC, 8-port 10BASET, 1990s
 CheetaHub Classic 2041, 1 10BASE2 / BNC, 1-port AUI, 16-port 10BASET, 1990s
 CheetaHub Power EH3024B, 24-port 100BASE-TX, Network_switch, 1990s
 CheetahSwitch Workgroup-3002A, 100BASE-TX, Network_switch
 CheetahSwitch Workgroup-3008A, 100BASE-TX, Network_switch
 CheetahSwitch Workgroup-3016A, 100BASE-TX, Network_switch
 EN2008, AUI to ethernet transceiver
 EN2032, AUI to ethernet transceiver
 EtherHub 5st 5-port 10BASET, 1990s
 EtherHub 8Mini: 1 10BASE2 / BNC, 8-port 10BASET, 1990s
 EtherHub 8e: 1 10BASE2 / BNC, 1-port Attachment_Unit_Interface, 8-port 10BASET, 1990s
 EtherHub 8s: 1 10BASE2 / BNC, 8-port 10BASET, 1990s
 EtherHub 8se: 1 10BASE2 / BNC, 8-port 100BASE-TX, 1990s, Network_switch
 EtherHub 12R: 1 10BASE2 / BNC, 1-port Attachment_Unit_Interface, 12-port 10BASET, 1990s
 EtherHub 12S: 1 10BASE2 / BNC, 1-port Attachment_Unit_Interface, 12-port 10BASET, 1990s
 EtherHub 16: 1 or 2 10BASE2 / 1 or 2 BNC, 16-port 10BASET, 1990s
 EtherHub-16i: 16-port 10BASET, 1990s
 EtherHub 16S: 1 10BASE2 / BNC, 16-port 10BASET, 1990s
 EtherHub 24s: 1 10BASE2 / BNC, 24-port 10BASET, 1990s
 EtherCoax-98X (EN1668C)
 EtherCombo-98X (EN1668)
 EtherRepeater II, 10BASE2 / AUI repeater
 EtherPair-16 (EN1658-P)
 EtherPair-98X (EN1668T)
 EtherCoax-16 (EN1642)
 EtherCoax-16 (EN1652)
 EtherCoax-16 (EN1662)
 EtherCombo-16 (EN1640)
 EtherCombo-16 (EN1650)
 EtherCombo-16 (EN1660)
 EtherDuo-16 (EN1657-P)
 EtherPair-16 (EN1661)
 EtherPair16-16T
 EtherPair-NE2 (EN1622)
 Fast EtherHub 12se: 12 -port 100BASE-TX, 1990s, Network_switch
 Fast Ethercard PCMCIA, 100BASE-TX, 1990s
 Fast SwitcHub 8s: 12 -port 100BASE-TX, 1990s, Network_switch
 EN1660-005 ISA 10BASET NIC, 1990s
 EN1660-005 ISA 10BASE2 / BNC_connector / AUI 100BASE-TX NIC, 1990s
 EN1207B-TX PCI 100BASE-TX NIC, 1990s
 EN1207D-TX PCI 100BASE-TX NIC, 1990s
 MR3202A Wireless access point
 Venus 5-port 10BASE2, 1990s

Recognition

		
2018 – Outstanding Work Environment in Gender Equality from the Hsinchu Science Park Bureau
2018 – National Quality Award from the Ministry of Economic Affairs (Presented by President Tsai Ing-Wen)

CSIRO patent issues 
The Australian Commonwealth Scientific and Industrial Research Organisation (CSIRO) holds the patent to a component of the IEEE 802.11n standard. This component is also part of other protocols marketed under the Wi-Fi trademark. The IEEE requested from the CSIRO a Letter of Assurance that no lawsuits would be filed for anyone implementing the standard. In September 2007, CSIRO responded that they would not be able to comply with this request since litigation was involved.

In April 2009, it was revealed that CSIRO reached a settlement with 14 companies including Accton plus other major technology companies —Hewlett-Packard, Asus, Intel, Dell, Toshiba, Netgear, D-Link, Belkin, SMC Networks, 3Com, Buffalo Technology, Microsoft, and Nintendo — on the condition that CSIRO did not broadcast the resolution.

See also
 List of companies of Taiwan

References 

Taiwanese companies established in 1988
Manufacturing companies based in Hsinchu
Electronics companies established in 1988
Electronics companies of Taiwan
1995 initial public offerings
Companies listed on the Taiwan Stock Exchange